Jun Nishikawa may refer to:
 Jun Nishikawa (JRA member)
 Jun Nishikawa (footballer)